An FHA insured loan is a US Federal Housing Administration mortgage insurance backed mortgage loan that is provided by an FHA-approved lender. FHA mortgage insurance protects lenders against losses. They have historically allowed lower-income Americans to borrow money to purchase a home that they would not otherwise be able to afford. Because this type of loan is more geared towards new house owners than real estate investors, FHA loans are different from conventional loans in the sense that the house must be owner-occupant for at least a year. Since loans with lower down-payments usually involve more risk to the lender, the home-buyer must pay a two-part mortgage insurance that involves a one-time bulk payment and a monthly payment to compensate for the increased risk. Frequently, individuals "refinance" or replace their FHA loan to remove their monthly mortgage insurance premium. Removing mortgage insurance premium by paying down the loan has become more difficult with FHA loans as of 2013.

The program originated during the Great Depression of the 1930s when the rates of foreclosures and defaults rose sharply, and the program was intended to provide lenders with sufficient insurance. The government subsidized some FHA programs, but the goal was to make it self-supporting based on borrowers' insurance premiums. Over time, private mortgage insurance (PMI) companies came into play. Now FHA primarily serves people who cannot afford a conventional down payment or do not qualify for PMI. The program has since this time been modified to accommodate the heightened recession.

History
The National Housing Act of 1934 created the Federal Housing Administration (FHA), which was established primarily to increase home construction, reduce unemployment, and operate various loan insurance programs. The FHA makes no loans, nor does it plan or build houses. As in the Veterans Administration's VA loan program, the applicant for the loan must make arrangements with a lending institution. This financial organization then may ask if the borrower wants FHA insurance on the loan or may insist that the borrower apply for it. Through the Federal Housing Administration, the federal government investigates the applicant and, having decided that the risk is favorable, insures the lending institution against loss of principal in case the borrower fails to meet the terms and conditions of the mortgage. The borrower, who pays an insurance premium of 0.5% on declining balances for the lender's protection, receives two benefits: a careful appraisal by an FHA inspector and a lower interest rate on the mortgage than the lender might have offered without the protection.

African Americans and other racial minorities were largely denied access to FHA-backed loans, especially before 1950, and only gained access in a handful of suburban developments specifically built for all-black occupancy.  Under the Eisenhower Administration, FHA tried to coax private developers to build more housing for minority buyers. This was done through its Voluntary Home Credit Mortgage Program. However, less housing was built under the program than expected, and FHA refused to deny insurance to developers who discriminated. The way FHA-backed loans were administered contributed to widening homeownership and racial wealth gap, even as they helped to build the white middle-class family.

Until the latter half of the 1960s, the Federal Housing Administration served mainly as an insuring agency for loans made by private lenders. However, in recent years this role has been expanded as the agency became the administrator of interest rate subsidy and rent supplement programs. Important subsidy programs such as the Civil Rights Act of 1968 were established by the United States Department of Housing and Urban Development.

In 1974 the Housing and Community Development Act was passed. Its provisions significantly altered federal involvement in a wide range of housing and community development activities. The new law made a variety of changes in FHA activities, although it did not involve (as had been proposed) a complete rewriting and consolidation of the National Housing Act. However, it did include provisions relating to the lending and investment powers of federal savings and loan associations, the real estate lending authority of national banks, and the lending and depositary authority of federal credit unions.

Further changes occurred in the 1977 Housing and Community Development Act, which raised ceilings on single-family loan amounts for savings and loan association lending, federal agency purchases, FHA insurance, and security for Federal Home Loan Bank advances. In 1980 the Housing and Community Development Act was passed; it permitted negotiated interest rates on certain FHA loans and created a new FHA rental subsidy program for middle-income families.

On August 31, 2007, the FHA added a new refinancing program called FHA-Secure to help borrowers hurt by the 2007 subprime mortgage financial crisis.

On March 6, 2008, the "FHA Forward" program was initiated. This is the part of the stimulus package that President George W. Bush had in place to raise the loan limits for FHA.

On April 1, 2012, the FHA enacted a new rule that requires their customers to settle with medical creditors in order to get a mortgage loan. This controversial change was rescinded and postponed until July 2012,  but was later cancelled altogether pending clarification and additional guidance. By November 2012, the FHA was essentially bankrupt.

FHA Loan Application Process
The FHA does not make loans.  Rather, it insures loans made by private lenders.  The first step in obtaining an FHA loan is to contact several lenders and/or mortgage brokers and ask them if they are FHA-Approved by the U.S. Department of Housing and Urban Development to originate FHA loans. Except in certain situations, it is also not possible to have two or more FHA loans at the same time.

Second, the potential lender assesses the prospective home buyer for risk. The analysis of one's debt-to-income ratio enables the buyer to know what type of home can be afforded based on monthly income and expenses and is one risk metric considered by the lender. Other factors, e.g. payment history on other debts, are considered and used to make decisions regarding eligibility and terms for a loan. FHA loans require a minimum FICO score of 580 to qualify for 3.5% down or 500 for 10% down. Additionally, the lender checks the financial history of the person getting the loan to see whether they have been delinquent on loans owed to the U.S. government; if they are, they do not qualify for a FHA loan. Mortgage lenders can add their own rules, also known as overlays on top of these minimum standards. As each lender sets its own rates and terms, comparison shopping is important in this market.

FHA approved lenders use a program called Desktop Underwriter also known as DU for mortgage approval. DU considers the potential borrower's debt ratio, reserves and credit score to make an automated credit decision.

The FHA makes provisions for home buyers who have recovered from "economic events". Via the Back To Work - Extenuating Circumstances program, the FHA reduces its standard, mandatory three-year application waiting period for buyers with a history of foreclosure, short sale or deed-in-lieu; and two-year application waiting period after a Chapter 7 or Chapter 13 bankruptcy. For buyers who can show that the economic event was preceded by at least a 20% household income reduction which lasted for six months or more; and who can show a satisfactory credit history for the most recent 12 months, the FHA will allow an application, and will agree to insure the home loan. The Back To Work program ended September 30, 2016.

Section 251 insures home purchase or refinancing loans with interest rates that may increase or decrease over time, which enables consumers to purchase or refinance their home at a lower initial interest rate.

FHA's mortgage insurance programs help low- and moderate-income families become homeowners by lowering some of the costs of their mortgage loans. FHA mortgage insurance also encourages lenders to make loans to otherwise credit-worthy borrowers and projects that might not be able to meet conventional underwriting requirements, protecting the lender against loan default on mortgages for properties that meet certain minimum requirements, including manufactured homes, single and multifamily properties, and some health-related facilities. The basic FHA mortgage insurance program is Mortgage Insurance for One-to-Four-Family Homes (Section 203(b)).

FHA allows first time homebuyers to put down as little as 3.5% and receive up to 6% towards closing costs. However, some lenders won't allow a seller to contribute more than 3% toward allowable closing costs. If little or no credit exists for the applicants, the FHA will allow a qualified non-occupant co-borrower to co-sign for the loan without requiring that person to reside in the home with the first time homebuyer. The co-signer does not have to be a blood relative. This is called a Non-Occupying Co-Borrower.

FHA also allows gifts to be used for down payment from the following sources:

 the borrower's relative 
 the borrower's employer or labor union 
 a close friend with a clearly defined and documented interest in the borrower
 a charitable organization 
 a governmental agency or public entity that has a program providing home ownership assistance

The Hybrid adjustable rate
FHA administers a number of programs, based on Section 203(b), that have special features. One of these programs, Section 251, insures adjustable rate mortgages (ARMs) which, particularly during periods when interest rates are low, enable borrowers to obtain mortgage financing that is more affordable by virtue of its lower initial interest rate. This interest rate is adjusted annually, based on market indices approved by FHA, and thus may increase or decrease over the term of the loan.  In 2006 FHA received approval to allow hybrid ARMs, in which the interest is fixed for the first 3 or 5 years, and is then adjusted annually according to market conditions and indices.

The FHA Hybrid provides for an initial fixed interest rate for a period of three or five years, and then adjusts annually after the initial fixed period. The 3/1 and 5/1 FHA Hybrid products allow up to a 1% annual interest rate adjustment after the initial fixed interest rate period, and a 5% interest rate cap over the life of the loan.  The new payment after an adjustment will be calculated on the current principal balance at the time of the adjustment.  This insures that the payment adjustment will be minimal even on a worst case rate change.

Down payment grants
Down payment assistance and community redevelopment programs offer affordable housing opportunities to first-time homebuyers, low- and moderate-income individuals, and families who wish to achieve homeownership. Grant types include seller funded programs, the  Grant America Program and others, as well as programs that are funded by the federal government, such as the American Dream Down Payment Initiative. Many down payment grant programs are run by state and local governments, often using mortgage revenue bond funds.

On May 27, 2006, the Internal Revenue Service issued Revenue Ruling 2006–27, in which it ruled that certain non-profit seller-funded down payment assistance programs (DPA programs) were not operating as "charitable organizations". The ruling was based largely on the circular nature of the cash flows, in which the seller paid the charity a "fee" after closing. Many believe that the "grant" is really being rolled into the price of the home. According to the Government Accountability Office, there are higher default and foreclosure rates for these mortgages.

On October 31, 2007, the Department of Housing and Urban Development adopted new regulations to ban so-called "seller-funded" down payment programs. The new regulations state that all organizations providing down payment assistance reimbursed by the property seller "before, during, or after" that sale must cease providing grants on FHA loans by October 30, 2007, with the exception of the Nehemiah Corporation. Nehemiah is the beneficiary of a lawsuit settlement with Department of Housing and Urban Development in April 1998. The terms of that settlement will allow Nehemiah to operate until April 1, 2008. Ameridream was granted an extension to the new regulations until February 29, 2008.

Several similarly operated government grant programs were introduced in response to the IRS Revenue Ruling in May 2006. Their governmental status made them exempt from the IRS Ruling, but they are still affected by the HUD Rule Change. One such organization was The Grant America Program, which was conducted by the Penobscot Indian Nation and had been available to all homebuyers in all fifty states.

Mortgage insurance

All FHA loans require mortgage insurance premium (MIP) irrespective of the size of the mortgage, down payment, and credit score. The FHA employs a two-tiered mortgage insurance premium (MIP) schedule. To obtain mortgage insurance from the Federal Housing Administration, an upfront mortgage insurance premium (UFMIP) equal to 1.75% of the base loan amount at closing is required, and is normally financed into the total loan amount by the lender and paid to FHA on the borrower's behalf. There is also a monthly mortgage insurance premium (MIP) which varies based on the amortization term and loan-to-value ratio.

FHA mortgage insurance premium (MIP) can be removed in two cases: first, if the initial loan-to-value ratio was less than or equal to 90%, second, if the FHA loan is refinanced. In the first case, FHA MIP is automatically removed after 11 years on mortgages where the borrower made an initial down payment of equal to or greater than 10% of the home value. In the second case, FHA MIP can be removed if the borrower pays off or refinances the FHA loan into a conventional loan. FHA MIP rates were lowered January 27, 2017  FHA MIP is not cancellable for mortgages originated after June 3, 2013. Starting March 20th, 2023, FHA insured loans have lowered their MIP rates by 30 bps across all scenarios, the most notable loans going from 85 bps down to 55 bps., ensuring affordability for Americans.

See also
 Government-backed loan

References

External links
  (Department of Housing and Urban Development)
 FHA Loan Limit Calculator (City/state/zip loan-limit calculator)
 FHA Approved Condo Lookup

Federal assistance in the United States
Insurance in the United States
Loans
Mortgage industry of the United States
Retail financial services
United States Department of Housing and Urban Development